Wahl is a commune and small village in western Luxembourg, in the canton of Redange.

Wahl, which lies in the south of the commune, has a population of 220.  Other villages within the commune include Buschrodt and Grevels. The commune administration for the three villages is located in Wahl's historic school building.

Population

Economy 
In addition to the commune administration, Wahl has a church and cemetery, but no local stores or restaurants. The local industry mainly comprises farming, with a few exceptions, like Topsolar (solar- & other alternative energies), Supernova Cult (fashion) and WebSEO (web design), who are the three main non-agriculture related businesses based in Wahl.

Notable persons 
 Foni Tissen (artist)
 Nicolas Grang (explorer)
 Nicolas Kransz (business man)
 Léon Peller (WWII resistance fighter)
 Albert Gricius (priest)

Wahl is also well known for a less "real" person. According to old local myths and legends, the village was also home to the fabled werewolf of Wahl, a man cursed after a dispute with the local minister.

References

External links
 Commune de Wahl - official municipality website

 

Communes in Redange (canton)
Villages in Luxembourg